Marine Wing Support Squadron 471 (MWSS-471) is a United States Marine Corps Reserve aviation ground support unit. Nicknamed the "Red Wolves," the squadron headquarters is in Minneapolis, Minnesota with outlying detachments in Johnstown, Pennsylvania (Det A) and Selfridge Air National Guard Base, Michigan (Det B Engineer Company). The squadron falls under the command of Marine Aircraft Group 41 and the 4th Marine Aircraft Wing.

Mission
Provide all essential Aviation Ground Support requirements to designated fixed-wing and rotary-wing components of an Aviation Combat Element (ACE), and all supporting or attached elements of the Marine Air Group.

History

See also

 United States Marine Corps Aviation
 Organization of the United States Marine Corps
 List of United States Marine Corps aviation support units

Notes

References
Bibliography

Web

 MWSS-471's official website

External links
 MWSS-471 in Operation Enduring Freedom

Military units and formations in Pennsylvania
4th Marine Aircraft Wing
MWSS471